C. typica may refer to:
 Coracina typica, the Mauritius cuckooshrike, a bird species endemic to Mauritius
 Cricosaura typica, the Cuban night lizard, a lizard species found only in Cuba

See also
 Typica (disambiguation)